The Critics' Choice Movie Award for Best Actor in an Action Movie is one of the awards given to people working in the motion picture industry by the Broadcast Film Critics Association at their annual Critics' Choice Movie Awards.

List of winners and nominees

2010s

Multiple nominees

2 nominations
 Daniel Craig
 Tom Cruise
 Robert Downey Jr.
 Chris Evans
 Brad Pitt
 Chris Pratt

A
Film awards for lead actor

Hhh